Hazel is an American sitcom about a spunky live-in maid named Hazel Burke (played by Shirley Booth) and her employers, the Baxters. The five-season, 155-episode series aired in prime time from September 28, 1961, to April 11, 1966, and was produced by Screen Gems. The first four seasons of Hazel aired on NBC, and the fifth and final season aired on CBS. Season 1 was broadcast in black-and-white except for one episode which was in color, and seasons 2–5 were all broadcast in color. The show was based on the single-panel comic strip of the same name by cartoonist Ted Key, which appeared in The Saturday Evening Post.

Synopsis

Seasons 1–4
Hazel is a competent, take-charge, live-in maid in the home of the Baxter family. George Baxter (Don DeFore) is a partner in the law firm of Butterworth, Hatch, Noll and Baxter; Hazel calls him "Mr. B". George's wife, Dorothy (Whitney Blake), is an interior decorator, whom Hazel nicknames "Missy". Their son Harold (Bobby Buntrock) is dubbed "Sport" by Hazel. The family dog is Smiley. Hazel had worked previously with Dorothy's family, and has a close relationship with her. Hazel's mother died when she was 14 (she said in one episode) so she had to take care of her own family.

The series humorously dramatizes Hazel's life with the Baxters and her friendships with others in the neighborhood such as postman Barney Hatfield (Robert Williams), taxi-driver Mitch Brady (Dub Taylor) and Rosie Hammaker (Maudie Prickett), another maid in the neighborhood. Many episodes focus on the perennial contest of wills between Hazel and George over issues around the house; "Mr. B" usually concedes defeat and grants Hazel's wishes when she tortures him by serving meager portions of her mouth-watering meals and desserts as an incentive for him to “lose a few pounds.” 

Some episodes take Hazel outside the Baxter house and follow her life in the community. In the first episode, for example, she spearheads a drive for the construction of a neighborhood playground. Hazel's life is sometimes complicated by George's snobby Bostonian sister Deirdre Thompson (Cathy Lewis) and his gruff client Harvey Griffin (Howard Smith). Dotty neighbors Herbert and Harriet Johnson (Donald Foster and Norma Varden) often call upon Hazel's expertise in household matters, of which they seem ignorant.

Network change and final season
After a four season run on NBC, the network canceled the series, but it was picked up by CBS for what would be a fifth and final season. In an effort to appeal to a younger audience, DeFore and Blake were dropped after the move to CBS. George and Dorothy’s departure was explained as a relocation to Baghdad, Iraq, for George's work. Hazel and Harold (who did not depart with his parents so he wouldn't miss any school) moved in with George's never-before-mentioned younger brother, Steve (Ray Fulmer), a real estate agent, Steve's wife Barbara (Lynn Borden), and their daughter Susie (Julia Benjamin). Hazel provided the same housekeeping services for her revamped family. As for the drop in two of the main characters, CBS had said that Blake was not available after the move to the network, although DeFore stated that he was never informed of the change and found out about it while reading a newspaper. Ann Jillian, who was then a teenager, was also added to the cast as Millie Ballard, Steve Baxter's receptionist. Jillian later went on to star in her own series, It's a Living, in the 1980s, as well as several television films.

Production notes

The series was filmed at Columbia Sunset Gower Studios, Hollywood, California. Exteriors were shot at the Columbia Ranch in Burbank. This movie ranch facade used as the Baxters' house had previously been seen in several Three Stooges films, and was used as the home for the Lawrences on the sitcom Gidget. From the driveway, the house next door to the right is recognizable as that of Darrin and Samantha Stephens from Bewitched. The episode "What'll We Watch Tonight", in which Hazel purchases a color TV, is the only first-season episode shot in color and appears to promote color television sets. NBC, which aired the series, was owned by RCA, the largest seller of color television sets, during the period when most viewers still had black-and-white TVs.

In July 1963, the National Association for the Advancement of Colored People (NAACP) announced that unless the show added a Negro person to the off-camera technical staff, the organization would begin a boycott of the show's sponsor, the Ford Motor Company. Two months after the announcement, the show's producers announced that a black production executive had joined the show.

In the pilot episode of the show, the part of George Baxter was played by Edward Andrews.  Test audiences were not comfortable with Andrews playing the role, so when the series was green-lighted it was recast with DeFore.

Theme song
While the weekly show began with an instrumental theme song composed by the team of Sammy Cahn and James Van Heusen, the closing credits during the first eight shows of the inaugural season played the song with lyrics sung by The Modernaires. There were different arrangements of the theme song as the series progressed, including a later version by Howard Greenfield and Helen Miller.

Sponsors
During its first four seasons, Hazel was sponsored by Ford Motor Company, which had earlier underwritten Tennessee Ernie Ford's comedy and variety show, The Ford Show. As a result, Ford vehicles, including the Mustang when it was introduced in 1964, were often prominently featured on the series, even as a part of the storyline (an example of product placement). During season four, Lever Brothers co-sponsored Hazel. In its final season, Procter & Gamble and Philip Morris were the sponsors.

Reception
The show's first season placed fourth in the 1961–1962 Nielsen's ratings. Shirley Booth received two Emmy Awards (1962 and 1963) for Hazel, and garnered a nomination for her third season (1964). Booth also received a Golden Globe nomination for Best TV Star (1964) and two posthumous nominations for the TV Land Award, Favorite Made-for-TV Maid (2004 and 2006).

ABC loosely copied the Hazel theme in the 1962–1963 series Our Man Higgins as an English butler to a suburban American family. Stanley Holloway played the lead role, along with Audrey Totter and Frank Maxwell.

At the end of the 1963–1964 season, the ratings had slipped from #15 the previous year to #22. By the time NBC canceled the series in the spring of 1965, Hazel had fallen out of the top 30 programs. CBS picked it up for the 1965–1966 season, and made a number of cast changes. Buntrock remained in the cast as Harold Baxter; DeFore and Blake were dropped and replaced with Fulmer and Borden, respectively. Child actress Julia Benjamin was added to the cast as Susie Baxter. In the spring of 1966, Hazel ended its primetime network run.

In 2014, according to Playbill, actress and cabaret performer Klea Blackhurst was cast in a New York City reading of Hazel, a musical based on Ted Key's cartoon character as well as the 1961–1966 TV sitcom. Lucie Arnaz directed the AEA reading that featured Blackhurst as Hazel in a cast that included Paul Shaffer as George Baxter, Jessica Keenan Wynn as Dorothy Baxter, Colin Crest as Harold Baxter, Warren Kelley as Bonkers Johnson, Ava-Riley Miles as Benedetta Bomicino, Bonale Fambrini as Scotty Fuyu and Ethan Khusidman as Reuben Steuben, along with Lance Roberts, Romelda Benjamin, Gerard Salvador, Erin Sullivan, Sharone Sayegh and Kevin Spirtas as the Narrator/Newscaster. The musical, which had first been announced to be in development for Broadway in 2010, was written by composer Ron Abel and lyricist Chuck Steffan, with a book by Lissa Levin. The industry presentations took place October 24–25, 2014, at the June Havoc Theatre.

Syndication

Hazel was seen in syndicated reruns on some local stations, mainly during the 1970s. Since then it has occasionally aired on some stations. On cable, Hazel aired on TBS from 1980 to 1986. It also aired on TV Land from 2002–2003. In 2011, it aired on Antenna TV and starting in 2015, it aired weekday mornings on FETV – Family Entertainment Television, GAC Family and GAC Living.

Episodes

Home media
Sony Pictures Home Entertainment released the first season of Hazel on DVD in Region 1 on August 1, 2006. On February 18, 2011, Shout! Factory announced that they had acquired the rights to the series (under license from Sony) and would be releasing season 2 on DVD in 2011. They have subsequently released seasons 2–4 on DVD. The fifth and final season was released on January 14, 2014.

References

Further reading

External links

 

1961 American television series debuts
1966 American television series endings
1960s American sitcoms
Black-and-white American television shows
CBS original programming
English-language television shows
Fictional maids
NBC original programming
Television shows based on comic strips
American television series revived after cancellation
Television series about families
Television series by Sony Pictures Television
Television series by Screen Gems